Chris Swanepoel (born 22 November 1984) is a South African professional golfer.

Swanepoel has played on the Sunshine Tour since 2004. He has won four times on tour, including the Golden Pilsener Zimbabwe Open in April 2012.

Professional wins (4)

Sunshine Tour wins (4)

Sunshine Tour playoff record (2–2)

References

External links

South African male golfers
Sunshine Tour golfers
Afrikaner people
South African people of Dutch descent
1984 births
Living people
21st-century South African people